Robat-e Olya (also Romanized as Robāţ-e ‘Olyā; also known as Robāţ) is a village in Mongasht Rural District, in the Central District of Bagh-e Malek County, Khuzestan Province, Iran. At the 2006 census, its population was 930, in 197 families.

References 

Populated places in Bagh-e Malek County